Michael Stryger (born 15 May 1983) is a Danish professional football midfielder, who currently plays for the Danish 2nd Division club Nykøbing FC.

Living people
1983 births
Danish men's footballers
SønderjyskE Fodbold players
Vejle Boldklub Kolding players
Danish Superliga players

Association football midfielders